Sonna is an American post-rock band. 

Sonna may also refer to:

 Sonna of Britonia, 7th-century Britonian priest in Galicia
 Sonna, Bagalkot, a village in Bilagi Taluka, Bagalkot District, Karnataka, India
 Sonna, Bellary, a village in Hagari Bommanahalli Taluka, Bellary District, Karnataka, India

See also
 Sunnah or sunna, the oral precepts of Mohammed, in Islam